Reginald Howell (16 April 1856 – 3 August 1912) was an English first-class cricketer active 1878–79 who played for Surrey. He was born in Streatham; died in Esher.

References

1856 births
1912 deaths
English cricketers
Surrey cricketers